Passenger to London is a 1937 British espionage thriller film directed by Lawrence Huntington and starring John Warwick, Jenny Laird and Paul Neville.

Cast
 John Warwick - Frank Drayton
 Jenny Laird - Barbara Lane
 Paul Neville - Vautel
 Ivan Wilmot - Veinberg
 Aubrey Pollock - Sir James Garfield
 Victor Hagen - Carlton
 Nigel Barrie - Sir Donald Frame

External links
 

1937 films
1930s thriller films
British black-and-white films
Films directed by Lawrence Huntington
British thriller films
1930s English-language films
1930s British films